Mediterranean fever  may refer to:

 Boutonneuse fever (also called Mediterranean spotted fever, fièvre boutonneuse, Kenya tick typhus, Marseilles fever or African tick-bite fever), a fever as a result of a Rickettsia infection caused by the bacterium Rickettsia conorii and transmitted by the dog tick Rhipicephalus sanguineus
 Brucellosis, a highly contagious zoonosis caused by ingestion of unpasteurized milk or undercooked meat from infected animals or close contact with their secretions
 Familial Mediterranean fever, a hereditary inflammatory disorder and an autoinflammatory disease caused by mutations in MEFV gene
 Mediterranean Fever (film), a 2022 film